Isabella River, a perennial stream that is part of the Lachlan catchment within the Murray–Darling basin, is located in the central–western region of New South Wales, Australia.

The river rises on the western slopes of the Great Dividing Range, between Isabella and Burraga, and flows generally south, south-west, north-west and west, before reaching its confluence with the Abercrombie River east of Tuena; descending  over its  course.

See also

 List of rivers of New South Wales (A–K)
 List of rivers of Australia

References

External links
 

Rivers of New South Wales
Murray-Darling basin